Admiral Lord William FitzRoy  (1 June 1782 – 13 May 1857), was an officer of the British Royal Navy who served during the French Revolutionary and Napoleonic Wars, and also as a Member of Parliament.

Biography

Family background
FitzRoy was the third son of Augustus FitzRoy, 3rd Duke of Grafton, by his second wife, Elizabeth, the daughter of the Reverend Sir Richard Wrottesley, Bt.; he was also an uncle of Vice-Admiral Robert FitzRoy.

Naval career
FitzRoy entered the Navy on 21 April 1794, on board the frigate , firstly serving under Captain William Bentinck, and following the battle of the Glorious First of June, under Captain Robert Stopford. He then served abroad the 74-gun , under Lord Hugh Seymour, following him into the 80-gun , and seeing action at the Battle of Groix on 23 June 1795.

FitzRoy was promoted to lieutenant on 13 May 1800 into the frigate , Captain the Honourable Henry Blackwood, in which he witnessed the surrender of Malta in September, and took part in the Egyptian Campaign in mid-1801. On 31 October 1801, he was appointed acting-commander and captain of the sloop HMS Salamine, and after confirmation on 7 January 1802 of his promotion, commanded . He returned to England, and from 26 January 1803 commanded . FitzRoy was promoted to post-captain on 3 March 1804, taking command of the frigate , and was present at the battle of Cape Ortegal on 4 November 1805, and at the invasion of Martinique in February 1809.

In June 1810 he commissioned the frigate  to serve on the Lisbon station. On 7 April 1811 FitzRoy was dismissed from the Navy after a court-martial found him guilty of "False Expense of Stores" and "Tyranny & Oppression". FitzRoy was charged with falsifying the reports of the ships stores and selling the surplus for his own profit. He also sentenced a seaman to 48 lashes for drunkenness, four times the legal maximum. Furthermore, when challenged, FitzRoy accused the master of "contempt" and had him clapped in irons, also in breach of naval law.

Despite being declared incapable of ever serving again as an officer, FitzRoy was restored to his former rank and seniority by the Prince Regent the following August, though he received no further employment in the Navy. Nevertheless, he was made a Companion of the Order of the Bath on 4 June 1815, promoted to rear admiral on 10 January 1837, and made a Knight Commander of the Order of the Bath on 4 July 1840.

Political career
Fitzroy was still on active service in Aeolus when he was elected as Member of Parliament for the family seat of Thetford in the 1806 election, and so did not make first appearance in the house until 1810, as a supporter of the Whigs. He was replaced as MP by his brother Lord John FitzRoy at the 1812 election.

Personal life
On 9 August 1816 he married Georgiana Raikes, the second daughter of Thomas Raikes, and had a son and three daughters, including:
Francis Horatio FitzRoy (6 June 1823 – 20 March 1900), who married in 1849 Honourable Gertrude Duncombe (1827–1916), daughter of William Duncombe, 2nd Baron Feversham, and left three daughters and two sons. Sir Almeric William FitzRoy (1851–1935) was their son.
Harriet Elizabeth FitzRoy (d.14 July 1875), who married in 1862 Colonel Michael Dawes
Elizabeth Georgiana FitzRoy (d. 5 February 1868)

Admiral FitzRoy died at East Sheen, London, on 13 May 1857, and is buried in Old Mortlake Burial Ground, Mortlake, London.

See also

References

1782 births
1857 deaths
William Fitzroy
Younger sons of dukes
Royal Navy personnel of the French Revolutionary Wars
Royal Navy personnel of the Napoleonic Wars
Members of the Parliament of the United Kingdom for English constituencies
Whig (British political party) MPs for English constituencies
Royal Navy rear admirals
Knights Commander of the Order of the Bath
UK MPs 1806–1807
UK MPs 1807–1812